Bely Ruchey is a rural locality (a village) in Devyatinskoye Rural Settlement, Vytegorsky District, Vologda Oblast, Russia. The population was 22 as of 2002.

Geography 
Bely Ruchey is located 26 km southeast of Vytegra (the district's administrative centre) by road. Depo is the nearest rural locality.

References 

Rural localities in Vytegorsky District